The recovery of US human remains from the Korean War has continued since the end of the war.

More than 36,000 American troops died during the Korean War (1950–1953). As of 2019, the Defense POW/MIA Accounting Agency describes more than 7,800 Americans as "unaccounted for" from the Korean War. The United States Armed Forces estimates that 5,300 of these troops went missing in North Korea.

Operation Glory
After the Korean Armistice, North Korea returned the remains of more than 3,000 Americans in what was termed Operation Glory in 1954. At the same time, US Graves Registration teams recovered remains from South Korea. The US identified thousands of these remains. In 1956, 848 sets of remains that could not be identified were buried in the National Memorial Cemetery of the Pacific, known as the Punchbowl Cemetery, in Honolulu, Hawaii. Others were later buried there as "unknown soldiers". Another "unknown soldier" was buried in the Tomb of the Unknowns at Arlington National Cemetery. The remains of all of these "unknown soldiers" were treated with formaldehyde, which, in later decades, made their identification through DNA testing difficult.

After the Cold War
From 1990 to 1994, North Korea uncovered and returned 208 boxes of remains. The United States Department of Defense's scientists estimate that the remains of as many as 400 people could be held in these boxes. By 2018, 182 people had been identified from the remains in these boxes.

In 1996 the US Department of Defense began dispatching teams to North Korea, carrying out 33 joint operations with the North Koreans and recovering about 220 sets of remains. The US government suspended these operations in 2005, officially because of concerns relating to the safety of US personnel. From 1996 to 2005, the US paid North Korea over US$20 million, ostensibly to cover the costs of these operations.

In 2007, North Korea sent home the remains of another seven US troops, at the time of the visit of an unofficial US delegation headed by US politician Bill Richardson. During the presidency of Barack Obama (whose term was 2009–2017), the issue was raised without results. In September 2016, North Korean officials made an offer to discuss the return the remains of about 200 US personnel, but the Obama administration did not pursue the offer.

The 2018 Singapore Summit and beyond
In the Singapore Summit in 2018, US President Donald Trump and Kim Jong-un of North Korea committed "to recovering POW/MIA remains, including the immediate repatriation of those already identified". On 27 July North Korea handed over 55 boxes of human remains. The remains were saluted in a ceremony in their honor by US soldiers. The North Korean authorities reported to the U.S. Defense POW/MIA Accounting Agency that they couldn't be sure how many individuals were represented in the 55 boxes. There was only one dog tag among the remains. Other servicemen could be identified through matching DNA, chest X-rays, and dental records. Twenty boxes were retrieved from the site of the Battle of Unsan, and 35 from the site of the Battle of Chosin Reservoir. There were boots, canteens, and other equipment among the remains.

By May 2019, six US servicemen had been identified from the remains in the 55 boxes. By October 2019, it was reported that 35–40 servicemen had been identified. After the failure of the Hanoi Summit, the US suspended the program.AS of April 1, 2022 82 remains have been identified from 55 boxes; the total of remains recovered from 1996 to 2005 are 612 of whom 16 are yet unknown.

At the September 2018 inter-Korean summit, South Korean President Moon Jae-in and North Korean leader Kim Jong-un agreed to a joint operation to recover remains in part of the Korean Demilitarized Zone. The South Korean Ministry of National Defense estimated that the remains of approximately 200 South Korean soldiers, 100 American and French soldiers, and an unknown number of North Korean and Chinese soldiers are buried in the area. The remains of just over a thousand American troops are thought to be buried in or near the DMZ. On 28 July 2019, President Moon said once excavation was complete for Arrowhead Ridge, they would expand it to cover the whole of the DMZ.

On September 22, 2021, the first US-South Korean Joint repatriation service was held: U.S. received the remains of 1 of 6 U.S. soldiers to be repatriated; South Korea received remains of two of 68 ROK Soldiers to be repatriated.

As of June 23, 2022, according to the US Department of Defense the total of working number of MIA U.S. service members is 7,541. The total of unaccounted remains is also given as 7,544.

See also

 United Nations Memorial Cemetery – in Busan, South Korea

References

Further reading
 

Aftermath of the Korean War
American military personnel killed in the Korean War
Funeral transport
Korean War prisoners of war
United States in the Korean War
North Korea–United States relations